The West Derby Hundred (also known as West Derbyshire) is one of the six subdivisions of the historic county of Lancashire, in northern England. Its name alludes to its judicial centre being the township of West Derby (the suffix -shire meaning the territory was appropriated to the prefixed settlement).

It covered the southwest of Lancashire, containing the ancient ecclesiastical parishes of Walton, Sefton, Childwall, Huyton, Halsall, Altcar, North Meols, Ormskirk, Aughton, Warrington, Prescot, Wigan, Leigh, Liverpool, and Winwick. It corresponds roughly to areas of Merseyside north of the River Mersey and also covered parts of modern West Lancashire Borough, Wigan borough, Warrington Borough and Halton Borough.

History

Domesday Book
When the Domesday Book was compiled, this hundred was composed of three separate hundreds of West Derby, Warrington and Newton-in-Makerfield.  The hundreds possibly united in the reign of Henry I. The hundred is surrounded on the west by the Irish Sea and in the south west and south by the River Mersey and Glazebrook, to the east is Salford Hundred and to the north east the River Douglas and Leyland Hundred. Apart from the manor which contained West Derby Castle, said to have been built by Roger of Poitou, there were several other manors which were owned by the Lord of the manor for his own use. At the time of the Conquest these manors incorporated six berewicks encompassing the villages of Thingwall, Liverpool, Great Crosby, Aintree, Everton, Garston and Hale. The main landowner at the time is listed as Uhtred (sometimes spelt Uchtred or Uhtræd)

Expansion of the boundaries
By the end of the 12th century the three separate hundreds had united and West Derby Castle was an important administrative centre rivalling Lancaster in the north of the county. Its position was strengthened by its proximity to the Port of Liverpool, which was founded by King John, trade with Cheshire and the passage of ferries from Liverpool to Birkenhead. By 1327 West Derby Castle was reported to be in ruins.

Court and laws on the hundred
A Wapentake court was held every three weeks with the steward of the hundred officiating. There had been a courthouse in West Derby for over 1000 years since the time of the Vikings. The present courthouse situated in West Derby is from a building which was constructed during the reign of Queen Elizabeth I. The court was used for the presentation of minor offences, or breaches of any laws within the hundred. The King, or lord of the manor had his own bailiff, who was the officer to the sheriff, who had the duty to ensure peace within the hundred and collect any taxes or levys from the people. From the reign of Stephen of England to that of Henry IV this office was a hereditary title held by members of the Walton family of Walton-on-the-Hill. By the fifteenth century the master of the forest was held by members of the Molyneux family, who also held the title of steward of the hundred.

Land changes hands
On 18 October 1229, Henry III granted all land from the Ribble to the Mersey, including West Derby, Liverpool, the village of Salford, and the wapentake of Leyland to Ranulf Earl of Chester and Lincoln. When he died in 1232 without any heir the land was inherited by William de Ferrers, through his wife Agnes, sister of the late earl. The land was then passed on to his son William, and then to his son Robert. In 1263, Robert held court against several people who had committed offences against the deer of his forest. In 1266 he rebelled against the rule of the King Henry III and was beaten at the Battle of Chesterfield, following this he was stripped of his title and land, which returned to the hands of the Crown, which was then given to Edmund, the King's second son, who was later created Earl of Lancaster. The title and land followed the line of descent of honour of Lancaster from Edmund until it was merged into the Crown in 1413, and is vested in the reigning monarch.

19th Century
In 1835 and 1895, Liverpool expanded to include West Derby. In 1889, all remaining administrative functions of historic counties were replaced by Administrative counties of England.

Places encompassed by the hundred of West Derby

Aintree
Ashton-in-Makerfield
Astley
Atherton
Aughton
Bootle
Childwall
Crosby
Eccleston
Everton
Hardshaw within Windle
Ince-in-Makerfield
Formby
Huyton
Kirkby
Knowsley
Leigh
Litherland
Lunt
Lydiate
Maghull
North Meols
Ormskirk
Pemberton
Prescot
Rainford
Rainhill
St Helens
Sefton
Skelmersdale
Southport
Tyldesley
Toxteth
Warrington
West Derby
Wigan
Widnes
Windle
Woolton

References

External links
 History Of Liverpool- West Derby Hundred Domesday Book Page
 English Translation of West Derby Domesday Book Page

History of Merseyside
Hundreds of Lancashire